USS Marmora may refer to more than one United States Navy ship:

 , a sternwheel steamer purchased on 17 September 1862 and decommissioned on 7 July 1865
 , a tanker commissioned on 13 December 1944 for use as a mobile floating storage ship, and decommissioned on 11 February 1946

United States Navy ship names